Tacit Networks, Inc. is an I.T. company based in South Plainfield, New Jersey. It was founded in 2000.

Their product lines are:
iShared which provides Wide area file services and WAN optimization.
Mobiliti (via the acquisition of Mobiliti) which provides backup, synchronization and offline access services to mobile users.

On January 30, 2004, Tacit Networks acquired the assets of AttachStor. The AttachStor technology provided the basis for the email acceleration feature in the iShared product.

On December 30, 2005, Tacit Networks acquired the assets of Mobiliti and integrated the Mobiliti product line into its portfolio.

On May 15, 2006, Packeteer acquired Tacit Networks and integrated the iShared and Mobiliti product lines into the Packeteer portfolio.

See also 
Wide area file services
WAN optimization

References

News article about AttachStor's acquisition by Tacit Networks
News article about Mobiliti's acquisition by Tacit Networks
News article about the Tacit acquisition by Packeteer

External links 
iShared product page on Packeteer.com

Network performance
Defunct computer companies of the United States
Computer companies established in 2000
Computer companies disestablished in 2006
Companies based in Middlesex County, New Jersey
South Plainfield, New Jersey
2006 mergers and acquisitions